Jugend und Tollheit (Youth and Madness) is a German silent film in three acts by Urban Gad from 1912, starring Gad's wife Asta Nielsen. It is one of the director's lost films.

Plot 

Leutnant Ernst von Prangen picks up his guardian, the manorial administrator Peter von Prangen, at the railway station. He puts a good face on the matter: Not only has he accumulated debts that he wants Peter to pay, he also wants Peter to allow him to marry the beautiful but poor teacher's daughter Jesta Müller. Peter agrees to pay Ernst's debts; however, he refuses to allow Ernst and Jesta to marry. What Ernst and Jesta do not know is that Peter himself is in financial difficulties and his estate is already heavily in debt. Back at his estate, Peter is visited by his neighbour Graabe, who wants his bill of exchange of 130,000 marks settled. He knows that Peter cannot pay the money and proposes a deal: The bill will be settled if Ernst becomes engaged to Graabe's daughter Sophie.

Peter tells Ernst about the deal he would like to make, which would help Peter and Ernst in the end. Ernst is also in a quandary, as he owes a lot to his guardian. It is Jesta who is prepared to fight. With the help of her brother and her father's wig, she transforms herself into a young man and thus accompanies her lover on the journey. Ernst, in turn, is not allowed to reveal Jesta's prank and introduces her to her father's estate as his friend "Burdock", a student. All sorts of complications ensue, mainly due to Jesta's need to keep her identity a secret and her difficulties in properly appearing as a man. She fails at skat, has to drink grog and smoke cigars and is supposed to share a bedroom with Ernst, whereupon she takes refuge in Peter's study with a pillow and spends the night there. Further embarrassments follow the next day as well: Jesta is forced to ride a horse and barely escapes a wig cut at the barber's, but has to be shaved. At the estate, Jesta again tries to spend every minute with Ernst, while Peter and Graabe try to let Ernst and Sophie spend undisturbed time together. Peter and Graabe try to persuade her to go swimming with the men, but Jesta is able to escape in time and also prevent an intimate scene between Ernst and Sophie at the last second. Old Graabe is so incensed by this that he gives Sophie the bill for 130,000 marks to use. Of necessity, Peter and Ernst agree to Ernst's engagement to Sophie, which is to be announced at a garden party the very next Sunday.

Jesta continues to try to disrupt Sophie and Ernst's meetings, but soon changes her tactics. She wants to seduce Sophie herself. Jesta encourages Sophie to drink alcohol and they both go for a walk in the moonlight. There is a kiss on the hand and finally an intimate kiss on the mouth and close embraces - observed by Ernst. When she also pretends that Sophie would never love her because she has Ernst in her hand through the bill of exchange, Sophie gives her the bill of exchange in her room as a pledge of her love. Jesta manipulates the room lamp so that all the gentlemen sitting in the garden can see their supposed love scene in the room as a silhouette. The company believe they see Sophie and Ernst, but Ernst enters their table just as Graabe has announced Ernst and Sophie's engagement. Outraged, everyone rushes to Sophie's room and tears her and Jesta apart. Jesta's wig is lost in the process. Sophie proves to be a fair loser. She realises that Jesta loves Ernst and also enforces that the large bill of exchange does not have to be cashed immediately. Together they all return to the party and Sophie announces to everyone's astonishment that Jesta and Ernst have become engaged.

Production 

Youth and Madness was shot in the summer of 1912 within a week at Bioscop's Neubabelsberg studio. After The Dance of Death, The General's Children, When the Mask Falls and Girls Without a Fatherland, it was the fifth part of the 1912-13 Nielsen & Gad series. The censors reviewed the film in September 1912. In December 1912, the film must have been screened for the first time following the screening schedule of all Nielsen films; however, the earliest recorded screening is from 3 January 1913.

Youth and Madness was shown in cinemas in numerous countries, including the USA (December 1913/January 1914, Lady Madcap's Way, General Film Company/Pathéplay), Italy (1913, Giovinezza e follia), France (February 1913, Ce que femme veut), Luxembourg (March 1913), Denmark (February 1913, Ungdom og dårskab), Mexico (April 1913, Juventud y locura) and the Netherlands (1913).

There is no known surviving print of what is believed to be 900 metres of film.

Reception 

Contemporary critics praised Nielsen's play: "Asta Nielsen's gentleman's suit suits her exquisitely, she looks brilliant and plays the funny intrigue with much humour and grace", according to the Danish Politiken. Urban Gad's excursion into the comic field was also praised:

In 1928, Asta Nielsen herself retrospectively described Youth and Folly as "a naïve, but jocular comedy, wherein I, as a young girl in men's clothes, go out on adventures with an enterprising uncle."

"Asta Nielsen's trouser-roll films are among the wittiest and most imaginative comedy produced at the time," critics said in retrospect.

Bibliography 

 Youth and Folly. In: Ilona Brennicke, Joe Hembus: Classics of the German Silent Film 1910-1930. Goldmann, Munich 1983, ISBN 3-442-10212-X, p. 197.
 Youth and Madness. In: Karola Gramann, Heide Schlüpmann (eds.): Moth. Asta Nielsen, her films. Volume 2 of the Edition Asta Nielsen. 2nd edition. Verlag Filmarchiv Austria, Vienna 2010, ISBN 978-3-902531-83-4, pp. 101-106.
 Youth and Madness. In: Renate Seydel, Allan Hagedorff (eds.): Asta Nielsen. Her life in photographic documents, self-testimonies and contemporary reflections. Henschelverlag, Berlin 1981, pp. 84-85.

References

External links 

 
 ''Youth and Madness at filmportal.de
 Youth and Madness at the Danish Film Institute
 Early Cinema (German)
 JUGEND UND TOLLHEIT on Murnau Stiftung (German)

1912 films
German black-and-white films
German silent films
German comedy short films
Lost German films
Drag (clothing)-related films
1910s German films